UAE Exchange (previously called Jebel Ali) is a rapid transit station on the Red Line of the Dubai Metro in Dubai, United Arab Emirates.

History
The station was inaugurated in March 2011 and was expected to handle over 4,000 passengers daily. It was the last stop on the Red Line until May 31, 2021, and has a total handling capacity of 11,000 passengers per direction. It is the only metro station that is built on the ground, and is not elevated or underground.

The station was previously called Jebel Ali, before it was renamed on June 30, 2015, to UAE Exchange following an agreement between Dubai's Roads and Transport Authority (RTA) and UAE Exchange. The naming agreement was inked as part of RTA's rebranding strategy.

The station is located next to another auxiliary depot used by the Dubai Metro. This is the second depot in Dubai Metro apart from the major depot at Rashidiya located near the Centrepoint Station, the last station on the other side of the Red Line and another depot located near the Etisalat metro station at the northern terminus of the Green Line.

Location
The station is located in Jebel Ali, and mainly serves employees working and living in the industrial zone of Jebel Ali Free Zone Authority (JAFZA).

References

Dubai Metro stations
Railway stations in the United Arab Emirates opened in 2011